The 1750 English cricket season was the seventh season following the earliest known codification of the Laws of Cricket. Details have survived of six eleven-a-side matches between significant teams, including three inter-county matches played between Kent and Surrey.

Matches
Six eleven-a-side matches between significant teams are known to have taken place.

18 June – Two Elevens – Artillery Ground
6 July – Kent v Surrey – Dartford Brent
9 July – Kent v Surrey – Artillery Ground
17 July – Dartford v Addington – Dartford Brent
9 July – Kent v Surrey – Artillery Ground
8 August – London v Hampton – Artillery Ground

Single wicket matches
A series of three single wicket cricket matches were played during September between teams led by Stephen Dingate and Tom Faulkner at the Artillery Ground in London. Faulkner's side won two of the matches with the other match ending in a tie.

Other events
A military match at Perth is the first known reference to cricket being played in Scotland.

Leading player Robert Colchin died at Deptford in April, probably of smallpox and in August Charles Lennox, 2nd Duke of Richmond died at Godalming. Lennox was one of the leading patrons of cricket at the time, in particular of Slindon Cricket Club and Sussex teams.

First mentions

Players
 Thomas Brandon (Dartford/Kent)

References

Bibliography

Further reading
 
 
 
 
 

1750 in English cricket
English cricket seasons in the 18th century